The Hollenstein Wagon and Carriage Factory is located in Mayville, Wisconsin. It was added to the National Register of Historic Places in 1979.

History
The factory was built by John J. Hollenstein, Sr. and his wife, Dominica, who moved to the United States from Switzerland. In addition to being a factory, the building also served as the Hollenstein's home. Hollenstein ran the business until 1908, when he sold the factory to his son. Afterwards, the building was bought and sold by multiple owners and served various purposes.

It is now the Hollenstein Wagon & Carriage Factory Museum of the Mayville Historical Society.

References

External links
 Mayville Historical Society - City of Mayville

Industrial buildings and structures on the National Register of Historic Places in Wisconsin
Museums in Dodge County, Wisconsin
Industrial buildings completed in 1876
Wagons
History museums in Wisconsin
National Register of Historic Places in Dodge County, Wisconsin
1876 establishments in Wisconsin